Maple City is a unincorporated community in Cowley County, Kansas, United States.

History
The post office was established December 16, 1872.

Education
The community is served by Dexter USD 471 public school district.

Notable people

Ferrell Anderson, a former Major League Baseball player, was born in Maple City.

References

Further reading

External links
 Cowley County maps: Current, Historic, KDOT

Unincorporated communities in Cowley County, Kansas
Unincorporated communities in Kansas